"Go Back" is a song by German recording artist Jeanette. It was written by Frank Johnes, Tom Remm, and Kristina "Wonderbra" Bach and produced by Cobra for her debut studio album Enjoy! (2000). Released as the album's first single and Jeanette's English language singing debut, it became a top ten hit in Germany, peaking at number eight, and was eventually certified gold by the Bundesverband Musikindustrie (BVMI). Internationally, "Go Back" reached the top twenty of the Swiss Singles Chart.

Formats and track listings

Charts

Weekly charts

Year-end charts

Certifications and sales

References

2000 songs
Jeanette Biedermann songs
Universal Music Group singles
Songs written by Kristina Bach
2000 debut singles